Lego Alpha Team was a Lego theme that was released in 2001 and ended in 2005. It focused on a group of secret agents and their evil nemesis named Ogel.

Overview 
Lego Alpha Team was a Lego product line that was in production from March 2001 to December 2005. It centred on a group of secret agents who aimed to stop an evil character named Ogel from changing people into skeleton drones with mind controlling orbs. The backstory was driven by the Lego Alpha Team PC game and other published media. The name "Ogel" is the word "Lego" in reverse. The theme influenced the Lego Agents theme, which was released several years later in 2008.

Storyline

Alpha Team starts out as a basic top secret group, under the leadership of Dash Justice. In the original video game, Ogel has captured all of  the Alpha Team agents except for Dash, And made evil orbs that can turn ordinary civilians into mindless drones to serve as his slaves. However, he is defeated by The Now reunited Alpha Team who break the power of the evil orbs to restore the drones back to normal. They capture Ogel and destroy the orb machine, but Ogel manages to escape.

The 2001 storyline is the exact same as the video game, Except the Alpha team agents are never captured, And they all have their own vehicles.

In the 2002 storyline, Ogel returns with more sinister looking drones. Ogel has re-engineered the evil orb so that it causes mutations and uses it to mutate sea creatures to serve him. Ogel's left hand is replaced by a transparent red hook that can still hold things. Alpha Team's helper, TeeVee (a television with legs and antennae) can now turn into a deep sea rover for small openings and scout around the sea embankment. In the webtoon, Into the Deep, Ogel's sinister plan for the mutant sea animals is destroyed when Dash reverses the orb factory controls, thus reverting all the sea animals back to normal. However, Ogel escapes again by detaching the cockpit on his Mutant Squid vehicle.

In the 2004 storyline, Alpha Team is revised. The Alpha Team symbol is changed, Crunch and Cam have been replaced by Diamond Tooth and Arrow (respectively), and Ogel has replaced his red hook with a transparent blue hook. Alpha Team has more tech and their vehicles have a new feature: they can initiate Alpha Mode, a feature that transforms one vehicle to another without disassembling and rebuilding. This time, Ogel's plan has gone from mind control to causing damage to the world. His plan is to freeze the world at his base in Antarctica with ice orbs to freeze time itself. The ice orbs are completely different from the evil orbs Ogel made earlier, as they no longer cause mutations/brainwashing, but instead freeze everything on touch. Alpha Team track him down to Antarctica. They race to Ogel's fortress in a desperate gamble to stop him from freezing time, Ogel ends up freezing almost all members of Alpha Team. However, Charge and TeeVee cannot be found in the iceboxes.

In the 2005 storyline, drones start to behave randomly and steal interesting landmarks. Then Zed, a special agent of Alpha Team, arrives at Antarctica. He melts the ice around the other agents and sets off on his own mission. While the other agents are stopping Ogel's drones, Ogel appears in the Scorpion Orb Launcher, his own vehicle that can convert into the Viper Escape. Ogel and Zed battle. The Lego Magazine invited fans to write their own stories about who would win and what would happen next. The Lego Magazine didn't show the results, but it was assumed that Zed has won the conflict and that the world has been restored to normal.

Characters

Alpha Team
Dash Justice: The main protagonist of Alpha Team. Motion Expert and Team Leader. Very brave but quite cocky. Loves the seaside. Team Color: Black/Blue
Crunch: Explosives Expert. Team Color: Green
Radia: Lasers Expert.  She controls the cockpit area in the Mobile Command Center. Extremely beautiful. Team Color: Purple/Pink
Charge: Electricity Expert. His gloves apparently allow him to fly with jets in them, as shown on the cover of the video game. Team Color: Blue/Red
Cam Attaway: Motors Expert and mechanic. Team Color: Red
Flex: Ropes expert. Team Color: Orange
Diamond Tooth: Mining Expert. Team Color: Green
Arrow: Alpha Team mechanic. Team Color: Yellow
Gearbox: All that is known about this agent is that he built the Tundra Tracker.
Zed: Special agent and the pilot of the Blizzard Blaster. Team color: Silver
Tee-Vee: Team's assistant. TeeVee, as the name suggests, was originally a Television with legs. He then became an underwater robot for Mission Deep Sea. In the final mission for Alpha Team, he was a fully functional android.

Ogel
Ogel: The ruthless villain of the series. He has been the main villain in each year of the series, constantly coming up with schemes to defeat Alpha Team. His first plot was to use Mind Control Orbs to turn regular people into mindless skeleton-like Drones. These Drones were reverted to normal when the Orbs were destroyed. Ogel returned the following year with a new plan to use mutated sea creatures to control the world's oceans. That plan was thwarted when Agent Dash reversed the controls to the Orb making machine. Ogel's underwater base was destroyed, but Ogel escaped before it exploded. His most recent plan for domination was freezing the world with new Ice Orbs that could freeze anything. His plan succeeded, but he was then stopped by special agent Zed in his Blizzard Blaster. He used to be in love with Radia.  "Ogel" is LEGO spelled backwards. In an issue of the LEGO Club Magazine, it was explained that this was due to him representing the exact opposite of LEGO (LEGO is fun, Ogel hates fun, etc.). Ogel is a direct descendant of Vladek, a villain in the Knights Kingdom series. . Greg Farshtey, the writer of Bionicle, Lego Exo-Force, and Alpha Team, among others, has stated that he is his favorite non-Bionicle villain.
Skeleton Drones: Ogel's minions, who are people who have been affected by Mind Control Orbs. Their appearance changes numerous times during the series.
Super Ice Drone: A Skeleton Drone with a black head that pilots the Scorpion Orb Launcher.

Construction sets
According to Bricklink, The Lego Group released a total of 34 Lego sets and promotional polybags as part of Lego Alpha Team theme. The product line was eventually discontinued by the end of 2005.

Original
The theme's first main sets and promotional polybags was released from 2001 to 2002. The original toy sets were centred around Alpha Team attacking Ogel's base, which was a control centre on a floating island. The team used a variety of vehicles to attack Ogel's base, including the Alpha Team ATV and the Cruiser. Each vehicle displayed the Alpha Team logo, which was a globe with a red ring around it. Ogel's logo was a skull face, which appeared on his control centre and ship.

 Ogel Command Stiker (set number: 6771) was released on 1 March 2001. The set consists of 28 pieces with 1 minifigure. The set included a Lego minifigure of Ogel.
 Alpha Team Cruiser (set number: 6772) was released on 1 March 2001. The set consists of 56 pieces with 1 minifigure. The set included a Lego minifigure of Radia.
 Alpha Team Helicopter (set number: 6773) was released on 1 March 2001. The set consists of 78 pieces with 1 minifigure. The set included a Lego minifigure of Dash.
 Alpha Team ATV (set number: 6774) was released on 1 March 2001. The set consists of 132 pieces with 2 minifigures. The set included Lego minifigures of Flex and Cam.
 Alpha Team Bomb Squad (set number: 6775) was released on 1 March 2001. The set consists of 190 pieces with 3 minifigures. The set included Lego minifigures of Tee Vee, Crunch and Charge.
 Ogel Control Center (set number: 6776) was released on 1 March 2001. The set consists of 411 pieces with 2 minifigures. The set included Lego minifigures of Ogel and two Drone Minion Commanders.

Mission Deep Sea
17 sets and promotional polybags was released from 2002 to 2003. The Mission Deep Sea sets were set beneath the ocean and focused on Ogel's underwater base. The toy sets also included aquatic vessels driven by Ogel, such as Mutant Squid and Mutant Killer Whale. Ogel's colour scheme of black and red was displayed on the base, mutant fish and Shark Sub, while the Alpha Team submersible vehicles were designed in yellow and black.

 Dash Jet Sub (set number: 1425) was released in 2002. The set consists of 22 pieces with 1 minifigure. The set included Lego minifigure of Dash.
 Cam Wing Diver (set number: 1426) was released in 2002. The set consists of 21 pieces with 1 minifigure. The set included Lego minifigure of Cam.
 Ogel Marine Slizer (set number: 1427) was released in 2002. The set consists of 21 pieces with 1 minifigure. The set included Lego minifigure of Ogel.
 Dash The Diver (set number: 3391) was released in 2003. The set consists of 1 minifigure of Dash with a harpoon.
 Ogel Mutant Ray (set number: 4788) was released on 15 February 2002. The set consists of 68 pieces with 1 minifigure. The set included Lego minifigure of two Skeleton Drones.
 AT Aquatic Mech (set number: 4789) was released in 2002. The set consists of 164 pieces with 1 minifigure. The set included Lego minifigure of Dash.
 Alpha Team Robot Diver (4790) was released on 1 January 2002. The set consists of 32 pieces with 1 minifigure. The set included Lego minifigure of Charge.
 Alpha Team Sub-Surface Scooter (set number: 4791) was released on 1 January 2002. The set consists of 43 pieces with 1 minifigure. The set included Lego minifigure of Flex.
 Alpha Team Navigator and ROV (set number: 4792) was released on 1 January 2002. The set consists of 102 pieces with 1 minifigure. The set included Lego minifigure of Cam.
 Ogel Shark Sub (set number: 4793) was released on 1 January 2002. The set consists of 111 pieces with 3 minifigures. The set included Lego minifigures of two Skeleton Drones and Drone Pilot.
 Alpha Team Command Patrol (set number: 4794) was released on 1 January 2002. The set consists of 188 pieces with 2 minifigures. The set included Lego minifigures of Radia and Crunch.
 Ogel Underwater Base and AT Sub (set number: 4795) was released on 1 January 2002. The set consists of 471 pieces with 4 minifigures. The set included Lego minifigures of Dash, Ogel and two Skeleton Drones.
 Ogel Mutant Squid (set number: 4796) was released on 1 January 2002. The set consists of 61 pieces with 1 minifigure. The set included Lego minifigure of Ogel.
 Ogel Mutant Killer Whale (set number: 4797) was released in 2002. The set consists of 56 pieces with 1 minifigure. The set included Lego minifigure of Skeleton Drone.
 Evil Ogel Attack (set number: 4798) was released on 1 September 2002. The set consists of 20 pieces with 1 minifigure. The set included Lego minifigure of Ogel.
 Ogel Drone Octopus (set number: 4799) was released in 2002. The set consists of 17 pieces with 1 minifigure. The set included Lego minifigure of Skeleton Drone.
 AT Jet Sub (set number: 4800) was released on 1 September 2002. The set consists of 23 pieces with 1 minifigure. The set included Lego minifigure of Dash.

Mission Deep Freeze
8 sets was released from 2004 to 2005. Mission Deep Freeze toy sets displayed more technical upgrades such as control panels, a new logo and new packaging. The storyline focused on Alpha Team's mission to find Ogel before he froze the world using ice orbs. His main base was a mountain fortress which was in the form of a skull.

 Chill Speeder (set number: 4742) was released on 1 June 2004. The set consists of 57 pieces with 1 minifigure. The set can transform into Alpha Mode and included Lego minifigure of Flex.
 Ice Blade (set number: 4743) was released on 1 June 2004. The set consists of 107 pieces with 1 minifigure. The set can transform into Alpha Mode and included Lego minifigure of Charge.
 Tundra Tracker (set number: 4744) was released on 1 June 2004. The set consists of 137 pieces with 2 minifigures. The set can transform into Alpha Mode and included Lego minifigures of Diamond Tooth and Radia.
 Blue Eagle versus Snow Crawler (set number: 4745) was released on 1 June 2004. The set consists of 255 pieces with 2 minifigures. The set can transform into Alpha Mode and included Lego minifigures of Dash and Ice Drone.
 Mobile Command Center (set number: 4746) was released on 1 June 2004. The set consists of 420 pieces with 5 minifigures. The set can transform into Alpha Mode and included Lego minifigures of Charge, Radia, Tee-Vee, Ice Drone and Arrow.
 Ogel's Mountain Fortress (set number: 4748) was released on 1 June 2004. The set consists of 431 pieces with 5 minifigures. The set can transform into Alpha Mode and included Lego minifigures of Dash, Ogel, Arrow and two Ice Drones.
 Blizzard Blaster (set number: 4770) was released on 1 January 2005. The set consists of 1303 pieces with 2 minifigures. The set can transform into Alpha Mode and included Lego minifigures of Zed and Ice Drone.
 Scorpion Orb Launcher (set number: 4774) was released on 1 January 2005. The set consists of 227 pieces with 2 minifigures. The set can transform into Alpha Mode and included Lego minifigures of Super Ice Drone and Flex.

Video game 

A video game, Lego Alpha Team, was developed by Digital Domain and published by Lego Media in September 2000 for Microsoft Windows, with a Game Boy Color version developed by Climax Studios and published in November of the same year.

It laid the groundwork for what would become the Lego alpha team theme, Which would release one year after the game.

See also
Lego Agents
Lego Ultra Agents

References

External links
Official Website 
Alpha-Mode - the online Lego Alpha Team database

Alpha Team
Fictional organizations
Products introduced in 2001
Products and services discontinued in 2005